Samson H. Chowdhury (25 September 1925 – 5 January 2012) was a Bangladeshi business magnate. He was the chairman of Square Pharmaceuticals.

Personal life

Samson H Chowdhury was born on 25 September 1925. at Aruakandi in Gopalganj. After completing education at the Scottish Church College in Kolkata, India, he returned to the then East Pakistan and settled at Ataikula village in Pabna District, where his father was working as a medical officer. Then he married Anita Biswas (Later Chowdhury) at the age of 22. In 1952, he started a small pharmacy in Ataikula village, which is about 160 km off capital Dhaka in the north-west part of Bangladesh. Chowdhury then ventured into a partnership pharmaceutical company with three of his friends in 1958. When asked why the name Square was chosen he remembers - "We named it SQUARE because it was started by four friends and also because it signifies accuracy and perfection meaning quality" as they committed in manufacturing quality.

He served as a vice president of the Baptist World Alliance from 1985 to 1990.  In addition to being a BWA vice president, Chowdhury served in other areas of the global Baptist organization, including on the BWA General Council, the Executive Committee, the Baptist World Aid Committee, the Promotion and Development Committee, and the Memorial Committee.  Chowdhury was elected president of the Bangladesh Baptist Church Fellowship (BBCF) a dozen times, and was honorary general secretary for 14 years, between 1956 and 1969. He was a president of both the National Church Council of Bangladesh and the National Evangelical Alliance.

Burial 
 
Samson H Chowdhury was buried at ASTRAS Firm House in Kashipur, Pabna.

Positions
 Chairman, Square Group
 Chairman, Mutual Trust Bank board of directors 
 Chairman, Astras Ltd.
 Honorary Member, Kurmitola Golf Club, Dhaka
 Former Vice President, Baptist World Alliance, 1985-1990 
 Former Chairman, Micro Industries Development & Services (MIDAS)
 Chairman, Transparency International, Bangladesh Chapter, 2004–2007
 President, Metropolitan Chamber of Commerce & Industries, Dhaka in 1996 and 1997
 Vice-President: International Chamber of Commerce, Bangladesh
 Former Director, The Federation of Bangladesh Chamber of Commerce & Industries (FBCCI)
 Member, Executive Committee of Bangladesh French Chamber of Commerce and Industry
 Director, Credit Rating Agency of Bangladesh
 Chairman, Central Depository Bangladesh Ltd
 Member, Advisory Committee of the Bangladesh Association of Pharmaceutical Industries
 Founder President, Bangladesh Association of Publicly Listed Companies
 Chairman, Masrangaa Television, Bangladesh

See also
 List of Bangladeshi people#Entrepreneurs
 Personal website of Mr. Chowdhury
 Square Pharmaceuticals

References

1926 births
2012 deaths
Bangladeshi businesspeople
Recipients of the Ekushey Padak
Scottish Church College alumni
People from Pabna District
Harvard University alumni
People from Gopalganj District, Bangladesh